Robert Bartlett may refer to:
 Robert Bartlett (surgeon) (born 1939), American physician who has made significant contributions to ECMO technology
 Robert Bartlett (explorer) (1875–1946), Newfoundland Arctic explorer
 Robert Bartlett (historian) (born 1950), English medievalist and television presenter
 Rob Bartlett (born 1957), American comedian, actor and writer
 Rob Bartlett (cricketer) (born 1972), Australian cricketer
 Bob Bartlett (1904–1968), U.S. Senator from Alaska
 Robert Bartlett (rugby league) (1927–2010), Australian rugby league footballer
 Robert V. Bartlett, American political scientist